The 1962 All-Ireland Junior Hurling Championship was the 41st staging of the All-Ireland Junior Championship since its establishment by the Gaelic Athletic Association in 1912.

Kerry entered the championship as the defending champions, however, they were beaten by Kildare in the All-Ireland home final.

The All-Ireland final was played on 30 September 1962 at New Eltham in London, between Kildare and London, in what was their first ever meeting in the final. Kildare won the match by 4-07 to 2-04 to claim their first ever championship title.

Results

All-Ireland Junior Hurling Championship

All-Ireland semi-finals

All-Ireland home final

All-Ireland final

References

Junior
All-Ireland Junior Hurling Championship